Zsolt Füzesi (born 23 January 1977 in Budapest) is a Hungarian football player who currently plays for FC Tatabánya.

References
 Futballévkönyv 1999 [Football Yearbook 1999], Volume I, pp. 78–82., Aréna 2000 kiadó, Budapest, 2000 

1977 births
Living people
Hungarian footballers
Stadler FC footballers
Budapesti VSC footballers
FC Tatabánya players
Association football forwards
Footballers from Budapest